could refer to:

 Gonbe, the protagonist of Sunsoft's arcade game, Ikki.
 Gonbe, one of the characters in the Pokémon series. Known outside Japan as Munchlax.
 Gonbe, the pet of the character Chimney from One Piece.